Inquisitor insignita is a species of sea snail, a marine gastropod mollusk in the family Pseudomelatomidae.

Description
The length of the shell attains 26 mm, its diameter 10 mm.

(Original description) The fusiform shell is gradually attenuate and incrassate. it is of a rich siennabrown in colour. it contains 12 whorls, including three whorls of the protoconch, smooth, shining brown, semidiaphanous, centrally carinate. The fourth whorl shows numerous somewhat undeveloped noduled riblets.  The remaining eight whorls are spirally ornamented with close revolving lines, crossing the conspicuously noduled longitudinal ribs. The nodules are white. The body whorl is obliquely twelve-ribbed, below the periphery obscurely fasciated with white. The siphonal canal is somewhat extended and straight columellarly. The outer lip is effuse. The anal sinus is well marked, narrow, but deep.

Distribution
This marine species occurs off the Philippines and Indonesia.

References

 Liu J.Y. [Ruiyu] (ed.). (2008). Checklist of marine biota of China seas. China Science Press. 1267 pp

External links
 
 
 Catalogue of Life in Taiwan: Inquisitor insignita

insignita
Gastropods described in 1923